Jalukbari is a locality in Guwahati, Assam, India, located between National Highway 31 and National Highway 37.

India 
Gauhati University, Assam Engineering College, Government Ayurvedic College, Jalukbari Sanskrit School are some of the educational institutions located in Jalukbari. Indian Institute of Technology Guwahati is situated at around 8 km away from Jalukbari. All India Institute of Medical Sciences is going to be set up at Changsari which is 17 km from Jalukbari. Girijananda Chowdhury Institute of Management and Technology is situated at 11 km distance from Jalukbari.

Landmarks
National Highway 31 passes through Saraighat Bridge in Jalukbari. Dr. Bhupen Hazarika's Samadhi Khetra is situated at Jalukbari

Transport
Guwahati International Airport is 13 km and Guwahati Railway Station is 12 km from Jalukbari. This area is connected with regular city buses along with other modes of transport.

See also
 Guwahati
 Western Assam
 Assam

References

Neighbourhoods in Guwahati